Olga Matīsa (born 15 July 1986) is a Latvian footballer who plays as a midfielder for Sieviešu Futbola Līga club Rīgas FS and the Latvia women's national team.

References

1986 births
Living people
Latvian women's footballers
Women's association football midfielders
Rīgas FS players
FC Skonto/Cerība-46.vsk. players
Latvia women's youth international footballers
Latvia women's international footballers